The Fletcher FBT-2 was a military trainer aircraft built in the United States in the early 1940s. Although it was never entered production as a trainer, it was ordered in small numbers as a target drone but when that was cancelled played a small part in the development of guided bombs.

Design and development
The FBT-2 was a low-wing cantilever monoplane with fixed tailwheel undercarriage which seated the pilot and instructor in tandem in an enclosed cockpit. Construction throughout was of plywood, and the wings were interchangeable, as were the tail panels.

Operational history
A single prototype was evaluated for military use, but generated no interest. However, the USAAF ordered the type as a radio-controlled target drone under the designation XPQ-11. The prototype FBT-2 was modified for use as a drone controller as the YCQ-1A. Two batches of 50 drones were ordered; however before any were delivered, the type was cancelled in favor of the PQ-8 Cadet, only the single prototype XPQ-11 being completed. The Army then ordered the ten PQ-11s under construction to be completed as XBG-1 glide bombs, the engine being removed and replaced with a  bomb. Testing was conducted, but the type failed to enter operational service.

Variants

 FBT-2 - basic trainer with Wright R-760 engine and tailwheel undercarriage (1 built)
 CQ-1 - drone controller with tricycle undercarriage (1 converted from FBT-2)
 PQ-11 - aerial target with tricycle undercarriage and Pratt & Whitney R-985 engine (contract cancelled before aircraft completed)
 BG-1 - glide bomb with  warhead (10 built from unfinished PQ-11s)

Operators

United States Army Air Forces

Specifications (FBT-2)

See also

References

Citations

Bibliography

FBT-2
1940s United States military trainer aircraft
Low-wing aircraft
Single-engined tractor aircraft
Unmanned aerial vehicles of the United States
Target drones
World War II guided missiles of the United States
Aircraft first flown in 1941